Brown Hornet may refer to:

Brown Hornet, a colloquial term for the European hornet
The Brown Hornet the cartoon superhero